Bomb Alley is a computer game. Bomb Alley may also refer to 

 1942 Operation Vigorous
 1982 Battle of San Carlos during the Falklands War
 3D Bomb Alley, a computer game